Calamus tenuis is a species of flowering plant in the family Arecaceae.
It is native to India, Assam, Bangladesh, Bhutan, Cambodia, Laos, Burma, Thailand, Vietnam, Java and Sumatra.

Its natural habitats are subtropical or tropical moist lowland forests and subtropical or tropical moist montane forests.
It is threatened by habitat loss.

Gallery

References

tenuis
Flora of the Indian subcontinent
Flora of Indo-China
Flora of Sumatra
Flora of Java
Plants described in 1832
Vulnerable plants